The Rhone Pipeline (French: Oléoduc du Rhône) is a crude oil pipeline, which connects Italy and Switzerland.

Route
The pipeline starts from the marine terminal in Genoa. It runs through the Alps and the Great St Bernard Tunnel to Collombey-Muraz in the Rhône Valley in the Swiss canton of Valais, where it supplies the Tamoil oil refinery at Collombey-Muraz.

History
The construction of the pipeline started in 1960.

Since 2015, the oil transport has stopped due to Tamoil's decision to idle the oil refinery of Collombey-Muraz.

Technical features

The capacity of the pipeline is approximately 1.1 million barrel of crude oil per year.

See also
 Transalpine Pipeline

References

Bibliography
 Ulrich P. Büchi: Die schweizerische Erdölfrage im Jahre 1968. in: Bulletin der Vereinigung Schweizerischer Petroleum-Geologen und -Ingenieure, 36, 1969, pp. 6–10.

External links
Oléoduc du Rhône S.A.
Pipelines en Autriche, Italie, Suisse. Oléoducs, gazoducs et produits dérivés GeoMondiale.fr
Eni in Svizzera
Erdöl – der Weg in die Schweiz

Energy infrastructure completed in 1966
Oil pipelines in Italy
Oil pipelines in Switzerland
Buildings and structures in Valais
Italy–Switzerland relations